The Military Police of Acre State are the preventive police force of the state of Acre. In Brazil, Military Police are reserve and ancillary forces of the Brazilian Army, and part of the System of Public Security and Brazilian Social Protection. Its members are called "State Military" person.

Organization 
The Military Police of Acre State is formed by battalions, companies, and platoons.
The battalions and independent companies are organized into Regional Commands. These Commands are in major urban centers, and their battalions and companies are distributed according to population density in cities.

History

The official history is that from 1904 to 1916, public security in the Acrean Territory was exercised by the Brazilian Army. On May 25, 1916, the Federal Government, through Decree No. 12.077, created the Regional Companies, with the objective of maintaining public order in each Department, including the then newly created Alto / Tarauacá. Regional Companies are considered to be the embryo that gave rise to today's Military Police.

The 1964 coup solved the problem, according to the ideas of the national security ideology, seeking the creation of an auxiliary military force, trained to respond to the guerrilla acts unleashed by organizations that challenged, through the armed struggle, the dictatorship then established.

The Military Police replaced, say, the "Public Forces" and the "Civil Guards", those in popular confrontations and those in preventive policing, under the direct control of the Army.

This is how Decree-Law 667, of July 2, 1969, assigned to the Ministry of the Army the control and coordination of the Military Police through the Army's General Staff throughout the national territory, by the armies and military commands of areas in the respective jurisdictions (sic) by the military regions in the national territories, the position of inspector general of the Military Police being performed by a brigadier general, in active service.

Due to lack of structure, the PMAC only came to be concretely installed on March 31, 1974. It is worth mentioning that for the purpose of commemorating his birthday, Law No. 812 of December 5, 1984, established the date of May 25, 1916 as the initial mark of PMAC.

Mission and organization
The PMAC's primary mission is to deter and control crime throughout the state, often by patrolling streets or public facilities in cities, such as schools. However, it is also responsible for monitoring the open lands, forests, rivers, and highways of the Acre, and will even carry out reconnaissance missions, referred to as P2.

The constitutional attributions of the Military Police of Acre State are provided for in § 5 of Article 144 of the Constitution, "the military police responsible for the ostensive policing and the maintenance of public order".
In addition:
In the fight against organized crime, through operations to catch criminals or seizure of weapons, drugs or contraband.
Providing direct services to the population, helping to transport patients, the orientation of people in difficulty, the intervention of domestic disputes, the routing of the poor to the agencies responsible for sanitation problems, housing
In specialized policing in tourist areas, stadiums, major events and festivals.
The supervision and control of the vehicle fleet in integrated actions with other public agencies.
The preservation of flora, fauna and the environment through specialized battalion.
In the security service forums of Justice in municipalities throughout the state.
In support of court officers in repossession cases and other court orders with risk.
The security of the executive authorities, the legislature and the judiciary.
Security of witnesses and people under threat.
In support of public, state and municipal agencies in activities such actions with the population of street and dealing with children and adolescents at social risk.

Special Units
 Special Operations Battalion (PMAC)
 Riot Control companies
 Battalion of Environmental Police
 Transit Battalion –

Administrative Commands
Teaching and Instruction Dept – Diretoria de Ensino e Instrução
Human Resources Dept. – Diretoria de Pessoal
Computer Science Dept. – Diretoria de Informática
Intelligence Dept. – Diretoria de Inteligência
Social Promotion Dept. – Diretoria de Promoção Social
Logistic Support Dept. – Diretoria de Apoio Logístico
Financial Dept. – Diretoria de Finanças
Internal affairs (law enforcement) – Corregedoria de Polícia 
An internal organization which investigates Police Excesses.

Ranks and insignia 

Officers

Enlisted

All rank insignia are worn on the epaulettes of the shirt, except for sergeants, corporal and soldiers, which are worn on each sleeve, below the institutional patch (left) and state flag (right).

Song of the Military Police of the Acre State

Notable officers
 Cel. Kinpara first military police officer to act on a peace mission by United Nations (UN) organizations.

References

See also 
 Acre State
 Military Police of Brazil
 Military Firefighters Corps (Brazil)
Brazilian Federal Police
Federal Highway Police
Brazilian Civil Police
 Brazilian Armed Forces
 Military Police
 Gendarmerie

Acre
Acre (state)